Karin Jäger (born 31 July 1961) is a German former cross-country skier. She competed at the 1980, 1984 and the 1988 Winter Olympics.

Cross-country skiing results
All results are sourced from the International Ski Federation (FIS).

Olympic Games

World Championships

World Cup

Season standings

Individual podiums
1 podium

References

External links
 

1961 births
Living people
German female cross-country skiers
Olympic cross-country skiers of West Germany
Cross-country skiers at the 1980 Winter Olympics
Cross-country skiers at the 1984 Winter Olympics
Cross-country skiers at the 1988 Winter Olympics
People from Korbach
Sportspeople from Kassel (region)
20th-century German women
21st-century German women